Stanley Myers (6 October 19309 November 1993) was an English composer and conductor, who scored over sixty films and television series, working closely with filmmakers Nicolas Roeg, Jerzy Skolimowski and Volker Schlöndorff. He is best known for his guitar piece "Cavatina", composed for the 1970 film The Walking Stick and later used as the theme for The Deer Hunter. He was nominated for a BAFTA Award for Best Film Music for Wish You Were Here (1987), and was an early collaborator with and mentor of Hans Zimmer.

Biography
Myers was born in Birmingham, England; as a teenager he went to King Edward's School in Edgbaston, a suburb of Birmingham. he married choreographer Eleanor Fazan.

Myers wrote incidental music for television: for example, The Reign of Terror, a 1964 serial in the television series Doctor Who; the theme to All Gas and Gaiters; and the theme for the BBC's Question Time.

He is known for composing music for the cult horror films House of Whipcord, Frightmare, House of Mortal Sin and Schizo for filmmaker Pete Walker.

The Pink Floyd website credits the brass parts on their 1968 song Corporal Clegg to "The Stanley Myers Orchestra".

Myers is best known for "Cavatina" (1970), an evocative guitar piece, played by John Williams, that served as the signature theme for Michael Cimino's 1978 film The Deer Hunter, and for which Myers won the Ivor Novello Award. A somewhat different version of this work, not performed by Williams, had appeared in The Walking Stick. And yet another version had lyrics added. Cleo Laine and Iris Williams, in separate recordings as He Was Beautiful, helped to make "Cavatina" become even more popular.

During the 1980s, Myers worked frequently with director Stephen Frears. His score for Prick Up Your Ears (1987) won him a "Best Artistic Contribution" award at the Cannes Film Festival. He also scored the film Wish You Were Here and several low budget features (Time Traveller, Blind Date, The Wind, Zero Boys) for director Nico Mastorakis, collaborating with Hans Zimmer. He won another Ivor Novello Award for his soundtrack to The Witches in 1991.

Myers died of cancer aged 63 in Kensington and Chelsea, London.

Filmography

Film

1960s

1970s

1980s

1990s

Television

References

External links
 
 Stanley Myers at the British Film Institute

1933 births
1993 deaths
20th-century British male musicians
20th-century classical musicians
20th-century English composers
Deaths from cancer in England
English classical musicians
English film score composers
English male film score composers
English television composers
Male television composers
Musicians from Birmingham, West Midlands
People educated at King Edward's School, Birmingham
Varèse Sarabande Records artists